Annunciation Catholic Church is a Roman Catholic parish located in northwest Washington, D.C. It has an attached school, Annunciation Catholic School. The parish is known for hosting regular musical performances, the Roth Concerts.

See also 

Official website
School website

References

Roman Catholic churches in Washington, D.C.